Shahnaz Saleem Malik is a Pakistani politician who has been a member of the National Assembly of Pakistan, since August 2018. Previously she was member of the National Assembly from 2008 to May 2018.

Early life and education
She was born on 13 January 1956 in Dera Ghazi Khan.

She did Master of Arts in 1983 and also has a degree of Bachelor of Arts. She did Bachelor of Laws in 1994 from Bahauddin Zakariya University and was a practicing lawyer.

Political career
She was elected to the Provincial Assembly of the Punjab as a candidate of Pakistan Muslim League (N) (PML-N) on a seat reserved for women in the 2002 Pakistani general election.

She was elected to the National Assembly of Pakistan as a candidate of PML-N on a seat reserved for women from Punjab in the 2008 Pakistani general election.

She was re-elected to the National Assembly as a candidate of PML-N on a reserved seat for women from Punjab in 2013 Pakistani general election.

She was re-elected to the National Assembly as a candidate of PML-N on a seat reserved for women from Punjab in the 2018 Pakistani general election.

References

Living people
1956 births
Pakistani women lawyers
Punjab MPAs 2002–2007
Pakistani MNAs 2008–2013
Pakistani MNAs 2013–2018
Pakistani MNAs 2018–2023
Pakistan Muslim League (N) MPAs (Punjab)
Pakistan Muslim League (N) MNAs
Women members of the National Assembly of Pakistan
Women members of the Provincial Assembly of the Punjab
People from Dera Ghazi Khan District
Bahauddin Zakariya University alumni
21st-century Pakistani women politicians